San Marco (Cilentan: Sandu Marco) is a southern Italian village and hamlet (frazione) of Castellabate, a municipality in the province of Salerno, Campania. As of 2009 its population was of 1,139.

History
Settled since the Paleolithic, San Marco was the location of the Ancient Roman town of Erculia. The village was first mentioned in 1168, identified as the farmhouse of Sancti Marci, part of the baronage of Castello dell'Abate. The original settlement extended behind the current port, and has expanded towards the end of the 20th century to the inland, due to its touristic growth.

Geography
Located in the central-northern side of Cilento, by the Tyrrhenian Sea, San Marco is extended from the national road 267, at the zone of Torretta, to the coast nearby the park of Licosa. It borders with the other frazione of Santa Maria and is 4 km far from Castellabate, 15 from Agropoli, 6 from Case del Conte, 11,5 from Agnone Cilento and 18 from Acciaroli. It counts a port that is served by hydrofoils for passenger transport.

Media
Benvenuti al Sud, an Italian adaptation of the 2008 French film Bienvenue chez les Ch'tis, has been set in Castellabate and partly in Santa Maria and San Marco.

Personalities
Agostino Di Bartolomei (1955-1994), football player
Marek Jackowski (1946-2013), polish rock musician

Gallery

See also
Cilentan dialect
Cilento and Vallo di Diano National Park

References

External links

Frazioni of the Province of Salerno
Coastal towns in Campania
Localities of Cilento